State Anthem of the Latvian SSR was the anthem of the Latvian Soviet Socialist Republic from 1945 to 1990 when Latvia was part of the Soviet Union.

During Soviet rule, the previous anthem, "Dievs, svētī Latviju!", composed by Kārlis Baumanis was illegal and the anthem was approved by the Supreme Soviet of the Latvian Soviet Socialist Republic on 19 July 1945. The original lyrics had references to Joseph Stalin until its replacement in 1977 when the references of him were removed. After Latvia regained independence in 1990, Dievs, svētī Latviju! was restored as its anthem on 15 February 1991.

Background

The music was composed by Anatols Liepiņš, and the lyrics were written by Fricis Rokpelnis and Jūlijs Vanags.

Lyrics

1977–1990 version

1945–1956 version
The pre-1977 version of the anthem was almost identical to the above version. The only differences were "Te skan mūsu pilsētas, Rīga te dimd" ("Here our cities ring out, here Riga resounds") was "Te mirdz mūsu pilsētas, Rīga te dimd" ("Here our cities shine, here Riga resounds"), "Mēs kļuvām par spēku, kas pretvaru veic." ("We became a power to wage revolution") was "Mēs kļuvām par spēku, kas naidnieku veic." ("We became the force that carries the enemy"), and ''Ar Oktobra karogu iesim mūždien" ("With the flag of October we will go on forever") was: "Ar Staļinu sirdī mēs iesim mūždien" ("With Stalin in our hearts we will go forever").

Notes

The chorus at the last stanza is repeated twice respectively.

References

External links
 Instrumental recording in MP3 format (Full version)
 Instrumental recording in MP3 format (Short version)
 MIDI file
 Vocal recording in MP3 format
 Lyrics - nationalanthems.info
 Original version (1945)

Latvian SSR
Latvian music
Latvian Soviet Socialist Republic